Tillandsia kolbii is a species of flowering plant in the genus Tillandsia. This species is native to Oaxaca, Chiapas, and Guatemala.

Cultivars
 Tillandsia 'First Born'

References

kolbii
Flora of Oaxaca
Flora of Chiapas
Flora of Guatemala
Plants described in 1981